William Foster, D.D. (3 July 1744 – November 1797) was a Church of Ireland bishop.

The younger son of Anthony Foster, Chief Baron of the Irish Exchequer,  and his first wife Elizabeth Burgh, he was chaplain to the Irish House of Commons (1780–89), then successively Bishop of Cork and Ross (1789–1790), Bishop of Kilmore (1790–1796) and Bishop of Clogher (1796–1797).

Family

He was the younger brother of John Foster, 1st Baron Oriel.

Foster married Catharina-Letitia (died 23 November 1814) daughter of Rev. Dr. Henry Leslie (1719–1803), LLD, of Ballibay, co. Monaghan. (Leslie, a scion of the family of the Earl of Rothes, was Prebend of Tullycorbet and then of Tandragee. His father, Rev. Peter Leslie, was rector of Ahoghill, and had married Jane, daughter of Most Rev. Dr. Anthony Dopping, Bishop of Meath). They had two sons, including John Leslie Foster, and five daughters. He was a father-in-law of Jerome, 4th Count de Salis-Soglio. He was a grandfather of Sir William Foster Stawell, William Fane De Salis and John Warren, 3rd Baron de Tabley.

One of his first cousins married Elizabeth Hervey,  Lady Bess Foster, a.k.a. Elizabeth, Duchess of Devonshire.

References

1744 births
1797 deaths
People from County Louth
Bishops of Cork and Ross (Church of Ireland)
Anglican bishops of Kilmore
Bishops of Clogher (Church of Ireland)
18th-century Anglican bishops in Ireland
Chaplains of the Irish House of Commons